Al Sahel Sporting Club is a Kuwaiti professional football club based in Abu Halifa. Sahel achieved a runner-up's finish in the 1999 Kuwait Emir Cup.

Honors
Kuwaiti Division One
Champions (2): 2000–01, 2009–10
Kuwait Emir Cup
Runners-up (1): 1998–99

Current squad

Coaches

References

External links
 Al Sahel Sporting Club

 
Sahel
Sahel
Sahel
Sahel